Mark Jones (born 16 March 1980 in Warrington) is a British auto racing driver.



Career

British Touring Car Championship

Jones drove in the final six rounds of the 2006 British Touring Car Championship for Xero Competition / Team Forward Racing in a Lexus IS200 alongside team mate Adam Jones, who had raced for most of the year. The car was an uncompetitive one, and his best finish was a sixteenth at Brands Hatch.

Racing record

Complete British Touring Car Championship results
(key) (Races in bold indicate pole position - 1 point awarded in first race) (Races in italics indicate fastest lap - 1 point awarded all races) (* signifies that driver lead race for at least one lap - 1 point awarded all races)

References

External links
 BTCC Pages Profile.
 Results

Living people
British Touring Car Championship drivers
1980 births